"Still a Thrill" is the second single from singer Jody Watley's self-titled debut album.

History
While the #56 (US) peaking "Still a Thrill" didn't necessarily match the pop chart success of its blockbuster predecessor, "Looking for a New Love", it was, however, a major hit on both the R&B and dance charts in 1987. Watley employed a deep lower register on this uptempo R&B / dance song, which she co-wrote. It was produced by Andre Cymone and David Z.

Covers
Indie Neo-soulsters, Soulscream, covered "Still a Thrill" on their 2001 album, Prototype @lpha1 2001 Neophunk. Synth-pop artist, Matthew Duffy, covered "Still a Thrill" on his album, Here I Come.

Legacy
T-Boz of TLC cited this song as an example setting her vocal tone for her singing career. In a personal video, she sent to Watley (and was given permission to share on her YouTube channel) T-Boz thanked Watley for this song during her teenage years citing she was "hitting them notes" and helping her sing at a lower register to better suit her vocal range.

Charts

References

1987 singles
1987 songs
Jody Watley songs
Songs written by André Cymone
Songs written by Jody Watley
Funk songs
MCA Records singles